The EMU3000 series is a series of electric multiple unit trains operated by the Taiwan Railways Administration (TRA). The trains are built by the Japanese company Hitachi Rail as inter-city trains and entered passenger service on 29 December 2021.

History 

The EMU3000 series was purchased as part of the TRA's plan to replace its aging fleet by 2024. That plan called for the purchase of 600 intercity cars, 520 commuter cars (EMU900 series), 102 locomotives, and 60 un-electrified passenger cars. Additionally, the EMU3000 series is expected to increase TRA's service capacity in Eastern Taiwan, where demand for tickets is high and often sell out around major holidays.

Bidding for the intercity trains commenced in October 2018 and saw entries from two companies, Hitachi and Stadler. The train's design was revealed to the public in November 2020.

The EMU3000 series are assembled in Hitachi's Kasado Plant in Kudamatsu, Yamaguchi Prefecture. While the first group of trains were slated to arrive in June 2021, the COVID-19 pandemic pushed back the trains' delivery. The first train was unloaded in the Port of Hualien on 31 July 2021. The remaining trains are scheduled to arrive by 2024.

Features 
The EMU3000 series runs in a 12-car formation, which is four cars longer than the TRA's last two intercity EMUs, the TEMU1000 series and the TEMU2000 series, which consist of 8 cars only. The train's exterior is designed around the concept of "silent flow" that is black and white with red accents. The interior of the train contains a total of 538 seats. The EMU3000 has a business class car (officially named the Teng-yun Cabinet) with larger seats, charging ports, internet access, and complimentary drinks and snacks.

Unlike its predecessors, the EMU3000 series does not have a tilting mechanism. According to Wang Kwo-tsai, the Minister of Transportation and Communications, improvements to track conditions in the past few years means that the tilting mechanism is unnecessary.

References

External links 
 

Electric multiple units of Taiwan
25 kV AC multiple units
Hitachi multiple units